Luxettipet or Lakshettipet is a municipality and census town in Mancherial district of the Indian state of Telangana. Located on the north bank of godavari river. And it is municipality and the headquarters of Luxettipet mandal. It is located in Luxettipet mandal of Mancherial revenue division.

Administrative Divisions 
There are 21 Villages in Luxettipet.

Place to Visit 

 Jagannatha temple and Shiva temple Brahmin street
 Gudem Satyanarayana Swamy Temple and Ayyappa Swamy Temple
 Sri Lakshmi Narasimha Swamy Devastanam located in Dharmapuri (about 20 km)
 Chinnaiah-Peddaiah Devasthanam
 CSI Church modela
 godavari river Yellampalli project back water 
 gundala waterfalls
 kotilingala on godavari river boating
 luxettipet godavari pushkara ghat
 Sai Baba temple gudem
 Manchu kondalu near chinnaiah gutta temple

Geography 
It has an average elevation of 145 meters (479 ft).

References 

Villages in Mancherial district
Mandal headquarters in Mancherial district